The first season of the German version of the reality show I'm a Celebrity...Get Me Out of Here! began on 9 January 2004 and ended on 20 January 2004. 12 contestants were announced to compete.

Contestants

Bushtucker Trials

References

Ich bin ein Star – Holt mich hier raus!
2004 television seasons
2004 in German television